The 25th Billboard Latin Music Awards ceremony, presented by Billboard magazine, honored the best performing Latin recordings of 2017 and took place on April 26, 2018 at the Mandalay Bay Events Center in Las Vegas. Billboard presented awards in 60 categories. The ceremony was televised in the United States by Telemundo for the 20th time, and was the culmination of the Billboard Latin Music Conference, which also took place from April 23 to April 26, 2018. Actress Gaby Espino and television presenter Marco Antonio Regil hosted the show. Espino first presided over the 22nd Billboard Latin Music Awards held in 2015. The awards recognized the most popular Latin performers, songs, albums, labels, songwriters and producers in the United States. Recipients were based on sales, radio airplay, online streaming and social data during a one-year period from the issue dated February 4, 2017 through January 27, 2018.

Daddy Yankee won eight awards, including Hot Latin Song of the Year and Songwriter of the Year, mostly due to the single "Despacito", which won all its six nominations. Other winners were Luis Fonsi and Justin Bieber with seven awards each, and Shakira with five. Maná received the Lifetime Achievement Award.

Winners and nominees

The nominees for the 25th Billboard Latin Music Awards were announced on February 7, 2018, at 9:03 a.m. EST (11:03 UTC). J Balvin and Shakira led the nominations with 12 each.

The winners were announced during the awards ceremony on April 26, 2018.

Awards

Winners are listed first, highlighted in boldface.

Special awards
Lifetime Achievement Award
Maná – In recognition of their contribution to Latin rock, their career achievements and philanthropic contributions.

Acts with multiple nominations
The following 27 acts received multiple nominations:

Presenters and performers

Presenters
As of April 12, 2018, confirmed presenters include Erika Ender, Oswaldo Silva, Alan Ramirez, Reykon, Yuridia, Diego Boneta, Leila Cobo, Gianluca Vacchi, Fernanda Castillo, Raúl Méndez, Carmen Villalobos, Catherine Siachoque, Aylin Mujica, Ana María Polo, Candela Ferro, Ana Jurka, and Karim Mendiburu.

Performers
As of April 19, 2018, confirmed performers include Jennifer Lopez, Bad Bunny, Becky G, Calibre 50, Cardi B, Chayanne, Christian Nodal, CNCO, Daddy Yankee, David Bisbal, De La Ghetto, Farruko, J Balvin, Karol G, Luis Fonsi, Maluma, Natti Natasha, Nicky Jam, Ozuna, Paty Cantu, Quavo, Reik, Ricky Martin, Sebastian Yatra, Sofia Reyes, Victor Manuelle and Wisin & Yandel.

References

2018 in Latin music
2018 awards in the United States
2018 in Nevada
March 2018 events in the United States
2018